Big Run may refer to:

Big Run, Ohio
Big Run, Jefferson County, Pennsylvania
Big Run, Marion County, West Virginia
Big Run, Marshall County, West Virginia
Big Run, Webster County, West Virginia
Big Run, Wetzel County, West Virginia
Big Run (East Branch Fishing Creek), in Sullivan County, Pennsylvania
Big Run (Little Muncy Creek), in Lycoming County, Pennsylvania
Big Run (South Branch Potomac River), in Hampshire County, West Virginia
Big Run (West Branch Fishing Creek), in Sullivan County, Pennsylvania
Big Run (Slippery Rock Creek tributary), in Butler County, Pennsylvania
Big Run, a 1989 arcade game developed by Jaleco